A Touch of the Blues is a live album by American jazz pianist Mal Waldron featuring performances recorded in Nuremberg, West Germany in 1972 and released on the Enja label.

Reception
The AllMusic review awarded the album 3 stars.

Track listing
All compositions by Mal Waldron
 "Here, There And Everywhere" – 13:07
 "The Search" – 8:07
 "A Touch Of The Blues" – 17:02
 Recorded at the East-West Jazz Festival in Nuremberg, West Germany, May 6, 1972

Personnel
 Mal Waldron – piano
 Jimmy Woode – bass
 Allen Blairman – drums

References

Enja Records albums
Mal Waldron albums
1972 live albums